Theodore Agustin Gega (born 18 August 1994), known professionally as Sin Boy, is a rapper, singer and songwriter in Greece of Albanian descent.

Life and career 

Gega was born on 18 August 1994 into an Albanian family in Nea Ionia, a northern suburb of Athens, Greece. Describing his early life, he stated that he was a victim of racism mostly because of his Albanian background.

Personal life 

In 2019, Gega began a romantic relationship with Kosovo-Albanian singer Rina. During an interview in Greece, he stated that he is not seeking Greek citizenship because of the mandatory military service.

Discography

Albums 

Ka Gu Ras (2019)
MM (2020)
One Love (2020)
Nos (2021)
Born Star (2022)
Genius (2022)
Ka Gu Ras III (2023)

Singles

As lead artist

As featured artist

Other charted songs

References

External links 

1994 births
21st-century Albanian rappers
Albanian expatriates in Greece
Albanian hip hop singers
Albanian pop singers
Albanian rappers
Greek rappers
Albanian songwriters
Living people
Modern Greek-language singers
Musicians from Athens
Trap musicians